Azerbaijani private cargo airline Silk Way Airlines serves the following destinations as of January 2021:

References 

Lists of airline destinations